In algebra, a group ring is a free module and at the same time a ring, constructed in a natural way from any given ring and any given group. As a free module, its ring of scalars is the given ring, and its basis is the set of elements of the given group. As a ring, its addition law is that of the free module and its multiplication extends "by linearity" the given group law on the basis. Less formally, a group ring is a generalization of a given group, by attaching to each element of the group a "weighting factor" from a given ring.

If the ring is commutative then the group ring is also referred to as a group algebra, for it is indeed an algebra over the given ring. A group algebra over a field has a further structure of a Hopf algebra; in this case, it is thus called a group Hopf algebra.

The apparatus of group rings is especially useful in the theory of group representations.

Definition
Let G be a group, written multiplicatively, and let R be a ring. The group ring of G over R, which we will denote by R[G] (or simply RG), is the set of mappings  of finite support (f(g) is nonzero for only finitely many elements g), where the module scalar product αf of a scalar α in R and a mapping f is defined as the mapping , and the module group sum of two mappings f and g is defined as the mapping . To turn the additive group R[G] into a ring, we define the product of f and g to be the mapping

The summation is legitimate because f and g are of finite support, and the ring axioms are readily verified.

Some variations in the notation and terminology are in use.

or simply

where this doesn't cause confusion.

Note that if the ring R is in fact a field K, then the module structure of the group ring RG is in fact a vector space over K.

Examples
1. Let , the cyclic group of order 3, with generator  and identity element 1G. An element r of C[G] can be written as

where z0, z1 and z2 are in C, the complex numbers. This is the same thing as a polynomial ring in variable  such that  i.e. C[G] is isomorphic to the ring C[]/.

and their product is

Notice that the identity element 1G of G induces a canonical embedding of the coefficient ring (in this case C) into C[G]; however strictly speaking the multiplicative identity element of C[G] is 1⋅1G where the first 1 comes from C and the second from G. The additive identity element is zero.

When G is a non-commutative group, one must be careful to preserve the order of the group elements (and not accidentally commute them) when multiplying the terms.

2. A different example is that of the Laurent polynomials over a ring R: these are nothing more or less than the group ring of the infinite cyclic group Z over R.

3. Let Q be the quaternion group with elements . Consider the group ring RQ, where R is the set of real numbers. An arbitrary element of this group ring is of the form

where  is a real number.

Multiplication, as in any other group ring, is defined based on the group operation. For example,

To be more specific, the group ring RQ has dimension 8 as a real vector space, while the skew field of quaternions has dimension 4 as a real vector space.

4. Another example of a non-abelian group ring is  where  is the symmetric group on 3 letters. This is not an integral domain since we have  where the element  is a transposition-a permutation which only swaps 1 and 2. Therefore the group ring need not be an integral domain even when the underlying ring is an integral domain.

Some basic properties
Using 1 to denote the multiplicative identity of the ring R, and denoting the group unit by 1G, the ring R[G] contains a subring isomorphic to R, and its group of invertible elements contains a subgroup isomorphic to G. For considering the indicator function of {1G}, which is the vector f defined by

the set of all scalar multiples of f is a subring of R[G] isomorphic to R. And if we map each element s of G to the indicator function of {s}, which is the vector f defined by

the resulting mapping is an injective group homomorphism (with respect to multiplication, not addition, in R[G]).

If R and G are both commutative (i.e., R is commutative and G is an abelian group), R[G] is commutative.

If H is a subgroup of G, then R[H] is a subring of R[G].  Similarly, if S is a subring of R, S[G] is a subring of R[G].

If G is a finite group of order greater than 1, then R[G] always has zero divisors. For example, consider an element g of G of order |g| = m > 1. Then 1 - g is a zero divisor:

For example, consider the group ring Z[S3] and the element of order 3 g=(123). In this case,

A related result: If the group ring  is prime, then G has no nonidentity finite normal subgroup (in particular, G must be infinite).

Take . Since  for any , we know , therefore . Taking , we have .
.
And we see that  are not zero, which shows  is not prime. This shows the original statement.

Group algebra over a finite group
Group algebras occur naturally in the theory of group representations of finite groups. The group algebra K[G] over a field K is essentially the group ring, with the field K taking the place of the ring. As a set and vector space, it is the free vector space on G over the field K. That is, for x in K[G],

The algebra structure on the vector space is defined using the multiplication in the group:

where on the left, g and h indicate elements of the group algebra, while the multiplication on the right is the group operation (denoted by juxtaposition).

Because the above multiplication can be confusing, one can also write the basis vectors of K[G] as eg (instead of g), in which case the multiplication is written as:

Interpretation as functions
Thinking of the free vector space as K-valued functions on G, the algebra multiplication is convolution of functions.

While the group algebra of a finite group can be identified with the space of functions on the group, for an infinite group these are different. The group algebra, consisting of finite sums, corresponds to functions on the group that vanish for cofinitely many points; topologically (using the discrete topology), these correspond to functions with compact support.

However, the group algebra K[G] and the space of functions  are dual: given an element of the group algebra

and a function on the group  these pair to give an element of K via

which is a well-defined sum because it is finite.

Representations of a group algebra 
Taking K[G] to be an abstract algebra, one may ask for representations of the algebra acting on a K-vector space V of dimension d. Such a representation

is an algebra homomorphism from the group algebra to the algebra of endomorphisms of V, which is isomorphic to the ring of d × d matrices: . Equivalently, this is a left K[G]-module over the abelian group V.

Correspondingly, a group representation

is a group homomorphism from G to the group of linear automorphisms of V, which is isomorphic to the general linear group of invertible matrices: . Any such representation induces an algebra representation

simply by letting  and extending linearly. Thus, representations of the group correspond exactly to representations of the algebra, and the two theories are essentially equivalent.

Regular representation 

The group algebra is an algebra over itself; under the correspondence of representations over R and R[G] modules, it is the regular representation of the group.

Semisimple decomposition
The dimension of the vector space K[G] is just equal to the number of elements in the group. The field K is commonly taken to be the complex numbers C or the reals R, so that one discusses the group algebras C[G] or R[G].

The group algebra C[G] of a finite group over the complex numbers is a semisimple ring. This result, Maschke's theorem, allows us to understand C[G] as a finite product of matrix rings with entries in C. Indeed, if we list the complex irreducible representations of G as Vk for k = 1, . . . , m, these correspond to group homomorphisms  and hence to algebra homomorphisms . Assembling these mappings gives an algebra isomorphism

where dk is the dimension of Vk. The subalgebra of C[G] corresponding to End(Vk) is the two-sided ideal generated by the idempotent

where  is the character of Vk. The isomorphism  is closely related to Fourier transform on finite groups.

For a more general field K, whenever the characteristic of K does not divide the order of the group G, then K[G] is semisimple. When G is a finite abelian group, the group ring K[G] is commutative, and its structure is easy to express in terms of roots of unity.

When K is a field of characteristic p which divides the order of G, the group ring is not semisimple: it has a non-zero Jacobson radical, and this gives the corresponding subject of modular representation theory its own, deeper character.

Center of a group algebra
The center of the group algebra is the set of elements that commute with all elements of the group algebra:

The center is equal to the set of class functions, that is the set of elements that are constant on each conjugacy class

If , the set of irreducible characters of G forms an orthonormal basis of Z(K[G]) with respect to the inner product

Group rings over an infinite group
Much less is known in the case where G is countably infinite, or uncountable, and this is an area of active research. The case where R is the field of complex numbers is probably the one best studied. Whether this is true if R is a field of positive characteristic remains unknown.

A long-standing conjecture of Kaplansky (~1940) says that if G is a torsion-free group, and K is a field, then the group ring K[G] has no non-trivial zero divisors. This conjecture is equivalent to K[G] having no non-trivial nilpotents under the same hypotheses for K and G.

In fact, the condition that K is a field can be relaxed to any ring that can be embedded into an integral domain.

The conjecture remains open in full generality, however some special cases of torsion-free groups have been shown to satisfy the zero divisor conjecture. These include:

 Unique product groups (e.g. orderable groups, in particular free groups)
 Elementary amenable groups (e.g. virtually abelian groups)
 Diffuse groups – in particular, groups that act freely isometrically on R-trees, and the fundamental groups of surface groups except for the fundamental groups of direct sums of one, two or three copies of the projective plane.

The case where G is a topological group is discussed in greater detail in the article Group algebra of a locally compact group.

Category theory

Adjoint
Categorically, the group ring construction is left adjoint to "group of units"; the following functors are an adjoint pair:

where  takes a group to its group ring over R, and  takes an R-algebra to its group of units.

When , this gives an adjunction between the category of groups and the category of rings, and the unit of the adjunction takes a group G to a group that contains trivial units:  In general, group rings contain nontrivial units. If G contains elements a and b such that  and b does not normalize  then the square of

is zero, hence . The element  is a unit of infinite order.

Universal property 
The above adjunction expresses a universal property of group rings. For any group homomorphism , there exists a unique -algebra homomorphism  such that  where  is the inclusion

In other words,  is the unique homomorphism making the following diagram commute:

Any other ring satisfying this property is canonically isomorphic to the group ring.

Hopf algebra 
The group algebra K[G] has a natural structure of a Hopf algebra.

Generalizations
The group algebra generalizes to the monoid ring and thence to the category algebra, of which another example is the incidence algebra.

Filtration

If a group has a length function – for example, if there is a choice of generators and one takes the word metric, as in Coxeter groups – then the group ring becomes a filtered algebra.

See also
 Group algebra of a locally compact group
 Monoid ring
 Kaplansky's conjectures

Representation theory
 Group representation
 Regular representation

Category theory
 Categorical algebra
 Group of units
 Incidence algebra
Quiver algebra

Notes

References
 
 Milies, César Polcino; Sehgal, Sudarshan K. An introduction to group rings. Algebras and applications, Volume 1. Springer, 2002. 
 Charles W. Curtis, Irving Reiner. Representation theory of finite groups and associative algebras, Interscience  (1962)
 D.S. Passman, The algebraic structure of group rings, Wiley  (1977)

Ring theory
Representation theory of groups
Harmonic analysis

de:Monoidring